Podopteryx selysi is a species of Australian damselfly in the family Argiolestidae,
commonly known as a treehole flatwing. 
It can be found in coastal northern Australia and New Guinea, where its larvae live in water-filled holes in tree trunks in rainforest.

Podopteryx selysi is a very large damselfly, black-metallic in colour with white to pink markings on its head and body.
Like other members of the family Argiolestidae, it rests with its wings outspread.

Unusually, and possibly uniquely for a damselfly, the hindwings of Podopteryx selysi are longer than its forewings. For other damselflies, forewings are usually marginally longer than hindwings.

Gallery

See also
 List of Odonata species of Australia

References 

Calopterygoidea
Odonata of Australia
Insects of Australia
Insects of New Guinea
Taxa named by Friedrich Förster
Insects described in 1899